The Heinzelmännchen are a mythical race of creatures, appearing in a tale connected with the city of Cologne in Germany akin to gnomes, or elves.

 
The little house gnomes are said to have done all the work of the citizens of Cologne during the night, so that the inhabitants of Cologne could be very lazy during the day. According to the legend, this went on until a tailor's wife got so curious to see the gnomes that she scattered peas onto the floor of the workshop to make the gnomes slip and fall. The gnomes, being infuriated, disappeared and never returned. From that time on, the citizens of Cologne had to do all their work by themselves.

This legend was first written down by the Cologne teacher Ernst Weyden (1805–1869) in 1826. It was translated into English by Thomas Keightley and published 1828 in his book The Fairy Mythology.

In 1836 the painter and poet August Kopisch published a famous poem beginning with the words:

The words were set to music by the German Lieder composer Carl Loewe, a contemporary of Schubert.

In Cologne, a fountain (Heinzelmännchenbrunnen) commemorates the Heinzelmännchen and the tailor's wife.

See also

References

External Links 
Hans Hotter sings Löwe's setting

Kobolds
Gnomes
Culture in Cologne